The 1975 Wirral Metropolitan Borough Council election took place on 1 May 1975 to elect members of Wirral Metropolitan Borough Council in England. This election was held on the same day as other local elections.

After the election, the composition of the council was:

Election results

Overall election result

Overall result compared with 1973.

Ward results
Results compared directly with the last local election in 1973.

Birkenhead

No. 1 (Argyle-Clifton-Holt)

No. 2 (Bebington and Mersey)

No. 3 (Cathcart-Claughton-Cleveland)

No. 4 (Devonshire and Egerton)

No. 5 (Gilbrook and St James)

No. 6 (Grange and Oxton)

No. 7 (Prenton)

No. 8 (Upton)

Wallasey

No. 9 (Leasowe)

No. 10 (Marlowe-Egremont-South Liscard)

No. 11 (Moreton and Saughall Massie)

No. 12 (New Brighton-Wallasey-Warren)

No. 13 (North Liscard-Upper Brighton Street)

No. 14 (Seacombe-Poulton-Somerville)

Bebington

No. 15 (Higher Bebington and Woodhey)

No. 16 (Park-New Ferry-North Bromborough)

No. 17 (South Bromborough and Eastham)

No. 18 (Lower Bebington and Poulton)

Hoylake

No. 19 (Caldy and Frankby)

No. 20 (Central-Hoose-Meols-Park)

Wirral

No. 21 (Barnston-Gayton-Heswall-Oldfield)

No. 22 (Irby-Pensby-Thurstaston)

Changes between 1975 and 1976

Notes

• italics denote the sitting councillor • bold denotes the winning candidate

References

1975 English local elections
1975
1970s in Merseyside